Chetwynd or Chetwynde may refer to:

Chetwynd (surname)
Chetwynd, British Columbia
Chetwynd Airport
Chetwynd Secondary School
Chetwynd, Indiana
Chetwynd, Shropshire
Chetwynde School, a private school in Barrow-in-Furness, Cumbria, England
Chetwynd Barracks
Chetwynd, Victoria, a town in the former Shire of Glenelg

See also
Chetwynd baronets
Viscount Chetwynd
Chetwynd-Talbot, a family name associated with the Earl of Shrewsbury and Earl Talbot